Tidjikja is the capital of the Tagant region of central Mauritania, lying on the Tagant plateau.  Founded in 1680, it has a population of around 11,000 people.

The town is known for its palm trees and its vernacular architecture.  The town is also home to an airport.  It is the birthplace of Mohamed Mahmoud Ould Louly, who served as President.

The city annually welcomes hundreds of tourists from all over Mauritania for the Date Festival. It is marked by its stands, concerts and recreational evenings. Several tents are set up in the large Bathaa of Tidjidkja, each of which is reserved for a theme linked to oasis life (agricultural popularization, traditional medicine of Ehel Maghary, exhibition of dates ...). The city is famous for its delicious dates. An NGO called 'Association for the Safeguarding of the Ghadima (ASG) was approved by the Ministry of the Interior by decree n ° 230 MID of August 30, 2017, since it has been working on the restoration of the heritage and the conservation of the old Ksar.

Nearby towns and villages include Moudjeria (65.8 nm), Ksar el Barka (46.4 nm), Rachid (21.3 nm), Ksar el Khali (143.4 nm), Ouadane (143.4 nm), Boumdeit (67.1 nm) and Serotandi (46.0 nm).

Climate

Tagant Region
Regional capitals in Mauritania
Communes of Mauritania
Populated places established in 1680
1680 establishments in Africa